St Andrew's Church (Andriivska tserkva) is an Orthodox church in Kyiv, constructed between 1747 and 1754 to a design by the Italian architect Bartolomeo Rastrelli, a rare example of Elizabethan Baroque in Ukraine. Situated on a steep hill, where Andrew the Apostle is believed to have foretold the great future of the place as the cradle of Christianity in the Slavic lands, the church overlooks the historic Podil neighborhood. Since 1968, the building has been a museum, part of the National Sanctuary "Sophia of Kyiv" as a landmark of cultural heritage. 

At the beginning of the 21st century the building faced serious problems due to the unstable foundation and it underwent major renovation at the end of the 2010s, after it was gifted to the Ecumenical Patriarchate of Constantinople.

Location

The church was consecrated in honor of Andrew the Apostle who is recognized as the "Apostle of Rus′". According to the chronicle The Tale of Bygone Years, Saint Andrew came to the Dnipro River's slopes in the 1st century AD and erected a cross on the current location of the church. He prophesied that the sparsely inhabited area would become a great city. As he predicted, the site arose to become the city of Kiev, a center of the Eastern Orthodox faith in Rus′.

In 1086, the Grand Prince of Kiev, Vsevolod I, constructed a small church dedicated to the erection of the cross by Saint Andrew. In 1215, Prince Mstyslav of Halych built the Church of the Exaltation of the Cross nearby. However, the church did not survive after the Mongol invasion of Kyivan Rus' in 1240. From that point after, wooden churches were constructed in the place where the Church of the Exaltation of the Cross had been located, although, were too destroyed and again replaced with another one.

In 1690, a wooden church consecrated to Saint Andrew was moved from the Brethren's cloister in the Podil to the Andriyivsky Mount. It too did not last long, only until 1726, when it was pulled down.

History

The idea to erect the church was conceived when Russian Empress Elizabeth Petrovna decided to construct a summer residence for herself in Kiev that would include a church. The palace was to be located in the Pechersk neighborhood while the church was to be on the Andriyivska Hill. The construction commenced with a ceremony on 9 September 1744: the Empress laying the first three founding stones herself The consecration was performed by Metropolitan of Kiev Raphael Zaborovsky.

The Petersburg Building Chancellery first hired German architect Gottfried Johann Schädel and engineer Daniel de Bosquet to draft out the plans for the church. However, when Schädel presented his project in 1745, the Chancellery rejected it. He was replaced by head architect of the imperial court, Bartolomeo Rastrelli, who worked out a plan which was closely based on a church of a Saint Petersburg institute.
 
The construction itself was conducted by a team of Russian and foreign masters under the direction of architect Ivan Michurin, who was previously successful in replacing the older Church of the Resurrection, on the Women's Market Square (Babiy torzhok) in Moscow. Michurin was responsible for carrying out all of the engineering and geological researches of the site and found out that a hard subsoil ground lies at a depth of 13–14 meters and above — made grounds penetrated by subterranean waters. With this information, Michurin developed the construction of a stone foundation and connected it with the two-storied building of the Priest's apartments, planned by Rastrelli.

I. Vlasiev and the Governor-General of Kiev, Mikhail Ivanovich Leontyev, were placed in charge of hiring masons, carpenters, and carvers from territories now located in Belarus, Lithuania, and Ukraine. White and red bricks for the church were made at the brick fields of the Sophia, Pechersk, and Cyril cloisters. The foundation stone was delivered by the Kyiv garrison soldiers from the neighboring towns of Rzhyshchiv and Bucha. The wood came from the nearby Pushcha-Vodytsia forests. Also, infantry regiments from Kyiv, Chernihiv, Starodub, and Poltava were involved in the church's construction. Apart from workers from the neighboring villages, the Kyiv Pechersk Lavra sent 50 of its best masons to work on the church.

Both the external and internal decoration on the church was carried out at the same time. Cast iron floor slabs were delivered from Moscow. Also, forms were made for the church's windows, doors, walls, and for space under the cupola. The planned iconostasis, designed by Rastrelli, was also added. The wood for the iconostasis, altar canopy, pulpit, and tsar's place were carved in Saint Petersburg in order to conserve time. The iconostasis' icons were carried out by Petersburg artists. For gilding, 1,028 slabs of gold were used in the interior.

The exterior work was finished in 1754, but it was not until 1767 that the interior work and decorations were completed. Alexei Antropov and Ivan Vishnyakov painted the church's icons, and the frescoes were done by Ukrainian masters I. Romenskyi and I. Chaikovskyi. A planned ramp that was to be installed to provide access to the church, was later changed to a wooden staircase due to the steepness of the hill. The wooden ramp was later (in 1844) changed to a cast iron one.

As the Empress died before the construction ended and her successors took no interest in the church, and the church was left without any funding. For some time, the church existed off of private and voluntary funds, from people such as Andrey Muravyov, who lived in a house close by.

In 1815, a strong storm tore off the church's cupolas. After the storm, the church was in need of a full restoration. In the next year, architect Andrey Melensky made a plan of the building's façade and sent them for consideration to Saint Petersburg. In 1825–1828, the church was restored, based on Melensky's plans. The red mission tiles was replaced by metal, resulting in the fact that the cupolas lost some decor and changed their form.

From 1917 to 1953, a series of renovations were conducted on the foundations of the church. In addition, the renovation of the church's façade, interior, and decor was also conducted. From the time of the church's opening until 1932, when the church was closed for worship, regular services were held. 

In 1935, the St. Andrew's Church was included into the Historical and Cultural Conservation "All-Ukraine Museum Area." For some time after 1939, Saint Sophia Anti-religious Museum was located within the premises of the church. During World War II, regular church services were restored, only to be closed down again in 1961. Since then, the church's stylobate was rented to different organizations up until 1992, when the stylobate was occupied by the Seminary of the Ukrainian Orthodox Church of the Kyivan Patriarchate. On January 10, 1968, the church was included into the State Architectural and Historical Conservation area "Saint Sophia Museum." On September 10 of the same year, the church was opened as a historical and architectural museum.

During the early 1960s, original plans of Rastrelli's baroque cupolas were uncovered in Vienna, Austria. In 1970, the St. Sophia Museum requested photocopies of the originals from the Albertina Museum located in Vienna. In 1978, restorers headed by architect V. Korneyeva restored the church's domes based on drawings by Bartolomeo Rastrelli. In 1987, the church was included into the National Conservation area "Saint Sophia of Kyiv." 

In 2008, the church was handed over to the Ukrainian Autocephalous Orthodox Church. 

In October 2018, the church was by law gifted to the Ecumenical Patriarchate of Constantinople as a stauropegion. On 21 August 2021, the Ecumenical Patriarch Bartholomew, on a visit to Ukraine by the invitation of Ukrainian president Volodymyr Zelensky, presided at the Vespers in the Stavropegion.

Architecture and preservation

The church was constructed on a 15-meter foundation-stylobate, which from the eastern side faces downhill and from the western—has a two-story construction. The church consists of a single dome and five small decorative spires. From the outside façade, Corinthian columns decorate the church, accompanied by additional decorations. The windows and doors of the church are decorated with ornamental details.

As the church sits atop a hill, foundation problems have been one of the main concerns of preservationists. More recently, the foundation below the church has started to shift, causing some concerns that the church's foundation might collapse. Cracks have already appeared in the church's foundation, resulting with the fact that a special committee was set up by the Minister of Emergency Situations Nestor Shufrich.

According to the Ministry of Emergency Situations, they will conduct research on the building's foundation and its construction with the help of Ministry of Construction, Kyiv City Administration, and the division of the Ministry of Emergency Situations in Kyiv City.

Gallery

References
Notes

Footnotes

Bibliography

External links

 St. Andrew’s Church opens in Kyiv after 11 years of unprecedented restoration works. 2021-02-11.
 
 
 St. Andrew’s Church, "Kyiv in Your Pocket"
 

Andrew's
Ecumenical Patriarchate of Constantinople
Museums in Kyiv
Religious museums in Ukraine
Art museums and galleries in Ukraine
Andriyivskyy Descent
Churches completed in 1754
1767 establishments in the Russian Empire
Baroque architecture in Kyiv
Andrews
Church buildings with domes
Architectural monuments of Ukraine of national importance in Kyiv
Bartolomeo Rastrelli buildings